Barnane is a townland in the civil parish of the same name in County Tipperary, Ireland. Barnane or Barnane-Ely is one of eleven civil parishes in the historical barony of Ikerrin. It is also part of the Ecclesiastical parish of Drom and Inch.

Location
It lies in the shelter of the southern slope of the Devil's Bit mountain. The R501 road nearby connects the village to the towns of Borrisoleigh to the west and Templemore to the east.

Legend
The townsland gets its name from the legend of Saint Patrick who was pursuing the Devil out of Ireland. In his haste to escape the Apostle of Ireland, the Devil took a bite out of the mountain. The resultant gap is what we see today in an otherwise smooth, table-like mountain. Spitting it out again, the "bit" landed in South Tipperary and formed the Rock of Cashel.

Facilities and places of interest
There is a three teacher primary school. It is in the catchment area for Drom-Inch GAA club.

A large country house, Barnane House, once stood in the parish, but little now remains since the house was abandoned by its owner Andrew Carden, circa 1920.

See also
 List of towns and villages in Ireland
 List of civil parishes of County Tipperary
 Carden baronets

References

Townlands of County Tipperary